George Johnston (12 February 1877 – 11 August 1945) was an Australian rules footballer who played with Carlton in the Victorian Football League (VFL).

Notes

External links 
		
George Johnston's profile at Blueseum	

Australian rules footballers from Victoria (Australia)
Carlton Football Club players
1877 births
1945 deaths